Alicia Molik and Lisa Raymond were the defending champions, but Molik chose not to compete in 2005; Raymond played alongside Samantha Stosur, but lost in the final.

Cara Black and Rennae Stubbs emerged as the winners.

Seeds

  Cara Black /  Rennae Stubbs (winners)
  Lisa Raymond /  Samantha Stosur (final)
  Elena Likhovtseva /  Vera Zvonareva (semifinals)
  Corina Morariu /  Květa Peschke (quarterfinals)

Results

Draw

References

2005 Women's Doubles
Advanta Championships - Doubles
Sports in Philadelphia
Tennis in Pennsylvania